Kaomianjin or roast gluten is a type of grilled noodle commonly served in Xi'an, China. Gluten dough, or seitan is shaped into spirals and baked over a barbecue before being sprinkled with spices.

References

Chinese noodles
Street food in China
Xi'an